During the 1960–61 NCAA University Division men's basketball season, a major gambling scandal broke. The scandal involved 37 arrests of students from 22 different colleges.

Jack Molinas, already a known gambling associate from the CCNY point shaving scandal in 1951, was implicated in this gambling scandal.  His partners were bookmaker Joe Hacken and Genovese crime family enforcer Vincent Gigante.

Included were Doug Moe of UNC, Tony Jackson from St. John's University, Roger Brown of University of Dayton, and students from NYU, North Carolina State, and the University of Connecticut

Hall of Famer Connie Hawkins was kicked out of Iowa, but was never involved: as a freshman he could have had no effect on varsity games.  No investigative action was taken against coach Scheuerman or varsity players (including All-American Don Nelson). Hawkins was barred from playing in NCAA, NIA, or the NBA due to these allegations until his lawsuit for reinstatement was successful in 1969, and he played with the Phoenix Suns.

Saint Joseph's University was stripped of its third-place finish in the 1961 NCAA tournament. Paul Tagliabue unknowingly played in a fixed game and as a result became ardently anti-gambling as the NFL's future commissioner.

References 

Gambling
1961 in sports in New York (state)
Academic scandals
College basketball controversies in the United States
History of college basketball in the United States
NCAA sanctions
NYU Violets men's basketball
Sports betting scandals